The Überetsch is a hilly section of the Etschtal in South Tyrol, northern Italy. It lies south-west of Bolzano and is a known tourist destination, famous for its wines, castles and lakes (Kalterer See, Montiggler Seen). The municipalities of the Überetsch are Kaltern and Eppan.

See also 
 Überetsch-Unterland
 South Tyrolean Unterland
 Überetsch Railway

Geography of South Tyrol
Italian wine
Nonsberg Group